George J. Sowden (born 1942 in Leeds, UK) is a designer and product developer.

Career 
He studied architecture at Gloucestershire College of Art in the 1960s. In 1970, he moved to Milan, where he started working with Ettore Sottsass and Olivetti. In parallel to the industrial design work on early Olivetti computers., he was involved during the 1970s in experimental "radical" design projects which enabled him to become, in 1981, one of the co-founders of the Memphis Group, the design movement that had a significant impact on design in the eighties.

In the same year, 1981, he founded his design studio, SowdenDesign, collaborating with companies such as Olivetti, Alessi, Bodum, Guzzini, Lorenz, Rancilio, Steelcase, Swatch, Segis, Memphis, IPM, Moulinex, Telecom Italia, Tefal and Pyrex.

In 1991, Sowden received the Compasso d'Oro Award for design excellence for Olivetti, Fax OFX420.

Notable works 

In 2010, Sowden developed the SoftBrew coffee brewing device, which is distributed and sold throughout the world, notably in collaboration with the Danish design company HAY.

References

 Baacke, R.-P., Brandes, U. & Erlhoff, M., Design als Gegenstand: der neue Glanz der Dinge (Frölich & Kaufmann, Berlin, 1983) 
 Barbara Radice, Memphis: research, experiences, results, failures, and successes of new design (Rizzoli, New York, 1984) 
 Silvia Katz, Classic plastics: from bakelite to high-tech : with a collector's guide. (Thames and Hudson, London, 1984) 
 Andrea Branzi, The hot house: Italian new wave design (Thames and Hudson, London, 1984) 
 Penny Sparke, Design in Italy: 1870 to the present (Abbeville Press, New York, 1988) 
 M. Collins, A. Papadakēs, Post-modern design (Rizzoli, New York, 1989) 
 British Design & Art Direction in collaboration with RotoVision, The product book (Crans-près-Céligny, Switzerland, 1999) 
 Fiell, C., Fiell, P., Haag, C., & Safavi, P., Designing the 21st century. (Taschen, Koln, 2001) 
 Peter Zec, Who's who in design. Vol. 2.  (AVedition, Stuttgart, 2003) 
 Terence Conran, Max Fraser, Designers on design (Conran Octopus, London, 2004) 
 Fiell, Charlotte, and Peter Fiell., 1000 Lights. Vol. 2 (Taschen, Koln, 2005)

External links 
Sowden SoftBrew official site
Biography  from 'Art and Culture' 
Biography on 'Ketterer Kunst Gallery'
Design samples on 'Artnet'

1942 births
Living people
British industrial designers
English expatriates in Italy
Compasso d'Oro Award recipients

Olivetti people